Kaloyan Dinchev (born February 3, 1980, in Stara Zagora) is an amateur Bulgarian Greco-Roman wrestler, who played for the men's heavyweight category. He won a bronze medal for his division at the 2006 World Wrestling Championships in Guangzhou, China. He is also a two-time Olympian, and a member of Slavia Litex Wrestling Club in Sofia, under his personal coach Bratan Tzenov.

Dinchev made his official debut for the 2004 Summer Olympics in Athens, where he placed second in the preliminary pool of the men's 96 kg class, against Kyrgyzstan's Gennady Chkhaidze and Palau's John Tarkong.

At the 2008 Summer Olympics in Beijing, Dinchev competed for the second time in the men's 96 kg class. He received a bye for the preliminary round of sixteen, before losing out to three-time Olympian and Czech wrestler Marek Švec, with a three-set technical score (4–1, 1–3, 1–1), and a classification point score of 1–3.

References

External links
Profile – International Wrestling Database
NBC 2008 Olympics profile

Bulgarian male sport wrestlers
1980 births
Living people
Olympic wrestlers of Bulgaria
Wrestlers at the 2004 Summer Olympics
Wrestlers at the 2008 Summer Olympics
Sportspeople from Stara Zagora
World Wrestling Championships medalists
20th-century Bulgarian people
21st-century Bulgarian people